Multiple sex partners is the measure and incidence of engaging in sexual activities with two or more people within a specific time period. Sexual activity with MSP can happen simultaneously or serially. MSP includes sexual activity between people of a different gender or the same gender. A person can be said to have multiple sex partners, when the person have sex with more than one person at the same time. Another term, polyamorous, is a behavior and not a measure describing multiple romantically sexually or romantically committed relationships at the same time.

Young people having MSP in the last year is an indicator used by the Centers for Disease Control and Prevention (CDC) to evaluate risky sexual behavior in adolescents and  monitoring changes in the worldwide HIV/AIDS infection rates and deaths.

Definitions and quantification
Epidemiologists and clinicians who quantify risks associated with MSP do so to identify those who have had sexual intercourse with more than one partner in the past 12 months. For the purposes of the World Health Organization (WHO)'s effort to eliminate HIV infection, quantifying measures progress in reducing the percentage of those with AIDS. The World Health Organization (WHO) has described their rationale by assuming that the spread of HIV in most locales depends upon the number of  MSP. Those who have MSP possess a higher risk of HIV transmission than individuals that do not have multiple sex partners.

WHO uses indicators, such as MSP, age, mortality, morbidity, geographical location and signs and symptoms of disease. This is done so that change can be measured and so that the effect of indicators can be assessed.

Following the initial quantification of the number of MSP, the respondent is again surveyed three and then five years later. In addition to the survey, respondents' sexual histories are obtained. Analysis assists those conducting the study to verify and help define the term MSP.

For the indicator MSP, WHO has defined a summary of what it measures, rationale for the indicator, numerator, denominator and calculation, recommended measurement tools,  measurement, frequency, and the strengths and weaknesses of the indicator.

WHO's definition of MSP has some strengths and weaknesses The quantification is an indicator and a picture of the levels of higher-risk sex in a locale. If those surveyed changed their activity to one sexual partner, the change will be quantified by changes in the indicator. This disadvantage is that though a respondent may reduce the number of MSP in a 12 month period, the indicator will not reflect this change in sexual activity. Even so, decreasing the number of MSP may not indicate a change. Potentially this definition and quantification may have a significant impact on the pandemic of HIV and used as a measure of program success. WHO recommends that additional indicators that quantify MSP more precisely to capture the reduction in multiple sexual partners in general. According to the CDC’s Youth Risk Behavior Surveillance System, having multiple sex partners has been quantified to mean that   those greater than or equal to age 25 had four or more sexual partners in one year.

Other examples
Epidemiologists in Tanzania used the indicator MSP in their study of AIDS incidence among 15-19-year-olds by documenting the respondent as being sexually active and having MSP in the last 12 months.

Social history (medicine)

A complete medical history includes an assessment of the number sexual partners with which a person has had within a certain time period.

A social history (abbreviated "SocHx") that part of a medical exam addressing familial, occupational, and recreational aspects of the patient's personal life that have the potential to be clinically important. MSP is only the description of the behavior described in clinical terms. Promiscuity can mean that a moral judgement is made because some parts of societies promote sexual activity to occur only within exclusive, single-partner, committed relationships. is often the way researchers define a society's promiscuity levels at any given time.  MSP increases the risk of many diseases and other conditions.

The CDC in the past has quantified  MSP for adolescents with the following descriptions:
 Never having had sexual intercourse (no MSP)
 Having multiple sex partners, defined as having had four or more sex partners during one's lifetime
 Sexual activity was defined as having had sexual intercourse during the past 3 months

Some clinicians define MSP by also taking into account concurrent sexual relationships.

Research
The likelihood of developing substance abuse or dependence increases linearly with the number of sex partners, an effect more pronounced for women. People who have a higher number of sex partners do not have higher rates of anxiety or depression.

Health risks

MSP increases the risk of developing bacterial vaginosis. MSP can result in pregnant women with a greater risk of contracting HIV. HIV is strongly associated with having MSP. Having multiple sex partners is associated with higher incidences of STIs.

Prevention of disease strategies include intensive counseling of those who have met the definition of multiple sex partners.

In Jamaica one of the primary contributing associations to the AIDS/HIV epidemic is the risky behavior of having multiple sex partners. A 2004 Behavioral Surveillance Survey demonstrated that 89 percent of males and 78 percent of females aged 15 to 24 had sex with a nonmarital or noncohabitating partner in the preceding 12 months. Fifty-six percent of males and 16 percent of females had multiple sex partners in the preceding 12 months.

In Sub-sahara Africa, travel and wealth is a risk factor in engaging in sexual activities with multiple sex partners.

References

Sexual health
HIV/AIDS
Epidemiology
Medical terminology